The Hamilton Kilty B's are a Canadian junior ice hockey team based in Hamilton, Ontario.  They play in the Golden Horseshoe Conference of the Greater Ontario Junior Hockey League. The team was known as the Stoney Creek Warriors prior to 2013 and the Ancaster Avalanche until 2018.

History
The Stoney Creek Warriors were formed in 1974 as a member of the Niagara & District Junior C Hockey League.  As a Junior C team, the Warriors would win four league titles.  The Warriors moved up to the Golden Horseshoe Junior B Hockey League in 1994 under the name Spirit.

In the Summer of 2013, the team was relocated to Ancaster, Ontario and renamed the Avalanche.  On September 7, 2013, hockey officially returned to Ancaster, as the Avalanche hosted the Buffalo Regals in their season opener and defeated them 10–3.  In 2016 the Avalanche became an affiliate of the OHL Hamilton Bulldogs.

In April 2018, the team announced they were moving to Hamilton, taking over the Kilty B's moniker, purchased from the ownership of the Markham Royals who were previously located in Hamilton as the Red Wings and Kilty B's.

Season-by-season results

Sutherland Cup appearances
2009: Brantford Eagles defeated Stoney Creek Warriors 4-games-to-1

References

External links
Kilty B's Webpage

Ice hockey teams in Hamilton, Ontario
Western Junior B Hockey League teams